Beethoven Ring is an annual award by the association "Citizens for Beethoven" of the city of Bonn.  (Citizens for Beethoven) is Bonn’s largest cultural association. Its purpose is to promote Beethoven’s music and preserve his memory in the city of his birth. In a vote, the 1500 members of the "Citizens for Beethoven" determine one out of the five youngest artists at the Beethovenfest Bonn, that have interpreted a work of Beethoven. The official award ceremony takes place within the framework of a concert in the Beethoven-Haus.
Other Beethoven Rings were awarded by the Beethoven Society Vienna or the Wiener Musikakademie.

Recipients

 2004 Gustavo Dudamel
 2005 Julia Fischer
 2006 Lisa Batiashvili
 2007 Giorgi Kharadze
 2008 Lauma Skride
 2009 Teo Gheorghiu
 2010 Sergei Khachatryan
 2011 Přemysl Vojta
 2012 Philippe Tondre
 2013 Ragnhild Hemsing
 2014 
 2015 Nicolas Altstaedt
 2016 Filippo Gorini
 2017 Igor Levit
 2018 Kit Armstrong
 2019 Nicola Heinecker
 2020 not awarded
 2022

References

External links
 

German music awards
Classical music awards
Ludwig van Beethoven
Awards established in 2004